Miss Thailand Universe 2003 was the 4th Miss Thailand Universe pageant, held at Sofitel Centara Grand Bangkok in Bangkok, Thailand on March 29, 2003. The contestants arrived a week earlier in Sa Kaeo to participate in activities to prepare contestants for the upcoming pageant . And then they returned to Bangkok to compete in the final round, which was broadcast live on BBTV Channel 7. Yaowalak Traisurat won the contest and represented Thailand in Miss Universe 2003 in Panama City, Panama.

Results
Color keys

The winner and two runner-up were awarded to participate internationally (two title from the Big Four international beauty pageants and two minor international beauty pageants) positions were given in the following order:

Delegates

External links 
 

2003
2003 in Bangkok
2003 beauty pageants
March 2003 events in Thailand
Beauty pageants in Thailand